Neoeucirrhichthys maydelli, the Goalpara loach, is a species of loach found in Assam, India, and possibly in Bangladesh.  It is the only member of its genus.

References

Cobitidae
Monotypic fish genera
Fish of Asia
Fish of India
Taxa named by Petre Mihai Bănărescu
Taxa named by Teodor T. Nalbant